Rosalie is an unincorporated community in Jackson County, Alabama, United States. On November 30, 2016, a devastating EF3 tornado struck the area.

Geography

References

Unincorporated communities in Alabama
Unincorporated communities in Jackson County, Alabama
North Alabama